Jagjivan Prasad Babu is a leader of the Samajwadi Party in Uttar Pradesh.
On 10 June 2016, he was elected to the Uttar Pradesh Legislative Council.

References

Living people
Members of the Uttar Pradesh Legislative Council
Year of birth missing (living people)
Samajwadi Party politicians from Uttar Pradesh